Racinaea monticola is a plant species in the genus Racinaea. This species is native to Bolivia and Ecuador.

References

monticola
Flora of Bolivia
Flora of Ecuador